Jelena Grubišić (born 20 January 1987) is a retired Croatian handballer who played for the Croatia national team.

She was given the award of Cetățean de onoare ("Honorary Citizen") of the city of Bucharest in 2016.

International honours 
EHF Champions League:
Winner: 2016
Bronze Medalist: 2017, 2018

Individual awards  
Most Valuable Player of the Final Four of EHF Champions League: 2016
Croatian Female Handballer of the Year: 2016
 Balkan-Handball.com Ex-Yugoslavian Handballer of the Year: 2016
All-Star Goalkeeper of the Romanian League: 2021

References

External links
 

1987 births
Living people
Croatian female handball players
Olympic handball players of Croatia
Handball players at the 2012 Summer Olympics
Handball players from Zagreb
Expatriate handball players
Croatian expatriate sportspeople in Slovenia
Croatian expatriate sportspeople in Hungary
Croatian expatriate sportspeople in Romania 
Győri Audi ETO KC players